Smith & Wollensky is the name of several high-end American steakhouses, with locations in New York, Boston, Chicago, Columbus, Houston, Miami Beach, Las Vegas, London, and most recently, Taipei. The first Smith and Wollensky steakhouse was founded in 1977 by Alan Stillman, best known for creating T.G.I. Friday's, and Ben Benson, in a distinctive building on 49th Street and 3rd Avenue in New York, once occupied by Manny Wolf's Steakhouse. Many of the restaurants have a wooden exterior with its trademark green and white colors. The individual Smith and Wollensky restaurants operate using slightly varied menus. In 1997, Ruth Reichl, then-restaurant reviewer for The New York Times, called Smith & Wollensky "A steakhouse to end all arguments.". Smith & Wollensky is owned by the Patina Restaurant Group.

Name
According to Stillman, there was never a Mr. Smith or a Mr. Wollensky involved.  He opened the Manhattan phone book twice and randomly pulled out two names, Smith and Wollensky.  The announcements for the opening, however, carried the names Charlie Smith and Ralph Wollensky.  Stillman later admitted that Charlie and Ralph were the names of his dogs.

IPO 

In 1999, Stillman announced initial public offering (IPO), to open at least three Smith & Wollensky restaurants every year around the U.S. The IPO took place in 2001 with a price of $8.50, and raised $45 million. The stock dropped 8.6 percent on the first day. After the IPO, the company was able to expand and grow sales, but the stock was not profitable. It had been consistently below the initial offering price. In 2007, Landry's offered an unsolicited $7.50 a share for the company, and a privately held Patina Restaurant Group offered $9.25 a share and succeeded in a buyout. In 2007, Nick Valenti, CEO of the Patina Restaurant Group and his partner Joachim Splichal, together with the Boston-based private equity firm Bunker Hill Capital, purchased The Smith & Wollensky Restaurant Group.

Locations

New York
Located in midtown Manhattan, the first S&W steakhouse occupies a stand-alone building whose wooden exterior bears the trademark green and white colors (which actually were inherited from Manny Wolf's Chop House, which operated between 1897 and 1977, when it became Smith & Wollensky, they simply changed the sign to "Since 1977" but otherwise kept the type of lettering used on the outside of Manny Wolf's the same). Also included is Wollensky's Grill, a bar room within the restaurant that has a more bar-type atmosphere and food, and is open later than the dining room. The New York location was used for a scene as a meeting place for Christian Bale and Willem Dafoe's characters in the 2000 film American Psycho. It and its kitchen were also used for scenes in the 2006 film The Devil Wears Prada. It was also used for the famous 2008 $2.11 million and 2007 $650,100 "Power Lunch with Warren Buffett" charity auction on eBay, with Zhao Danyang and Mohnish Pabrai & Guy Spier, respectively.

When Mr. Stillman sold the Smith & Wollensky Restaurant Group he retained ownership of the New York restaurant, although all locations share promotional and marketing efforts.

Chicago
Bearing the same green and white painted exterior the New York location has, this steakhouse overlooks the Chicago River and the Loop. It played a role in the revival of Chicago's River North area, and is neighbored by Marina City and the House of Blues. This location was featured in the 2006 film The Break-Up.

Miami Beach
In a two-story building on the waterfront, the S&W's Miami is technically located at the extreme southern end of Miami Beach, and offers views of the Miami skyline and ships passing through Government Cut into and out of the port of Miami. It takes advantage of its waterfront location, with an outdoor patio for diners to enjoy the outdoors.

Las Vegas
The restaurant had three floors and was across from the City Center on the Las Vegas Strip.

Two years later, the restaurant re-opened May 15, 2019, in a significantly smaller location within the Grand Canal Shoppes at The Venetian Las Vegas.

Columbus
The restaurant opened in 2002 and is in the Easton Town Center lifestyle center.

Houston
The restaurant, which has two stories and features a view deck overlooking one of the nicer areas in the city in Highland Village, is similar to the Columbus location in that it was built as part of a "lifestyle community".  This location is now closed.

Massachusetts
Two Smith & Wollensky restaurants exist in Massachusetts, with the Boston-based restaurant located on the Fort Point Channel near South Station and the second restaurant in Wellesley.

The original Boston restaurant closed in May 2018. This location formally occupied the Armory of the First Corps of Cadets, a castle built in 1891 originally intended as a military building, and was the only Smith & Wollensky location on the National Register of Historic Places.

London

Opened in June 2015, as the brand's first restaurant outside of the US. Located in the landmark Adelphi Building off of The Strand.

Taipei

The brand's first restaurant in Asia opened in the city of Taipei in 2019.

Brand
In 2014, Smith & Wollensky Restaurant Group started an additional restaurant type called Smith $ Wollensky's Grill.

Capitalizing on the restaurant's New York City roots, showmanship and creative risk have been perennial hallmarks of Smith & Wollensky's promotion from day one.  An early TV commercial by agency Angotti Thomas Hedge showed waiters botching famous theatrical soliloquies ("To be or not to be") because they "wanted to be waiters, not actors." More recently, the steakhouse promoted itself with the theme "If steak were a religion, this would be its cathedral." Johann Sebastian Bach's Mass in B Minor backgrounds a rapid-paced montage of patrons, food, waiters, and wine. This commercial by Seiter & Miller Advertising was seen throughout New York City and featured on newly installed taxi television screens.

See also
 List of restaurants in New York City
 List of steakhouses

References

External links

 

Restaurants established in 1977
Restaurants in Boston
Restaurants in New York City
Steakhouses in the United States